Ghanshyam Saraf is a member of the Haryana Legislative Assembly from the BJP representing the Bhiwani Vidhan sabha Constituency in Haryana.

References 

People from Bhiwani district
Bharatiya Janata Party politicians from Haryana
Living people
Haryana MLAs 2019–2024
Haryana MLAs 2014–2019
1963 births